The canopy chameleon (Furcifer willsii), also known commonly as Wills's chameleon or incorrectly as Will's chameleon, is a species of lizard in the family Chamaeleonidae. The species is endemic to Madagascar. The species was originally described by Albert Günther in 1890.

Etymology
The specific name, willsii, is in honour of English ornithologist Rev. James Wills (1836–1898), who was a missionary in Madagascar from 1870 to 1898.

Geographic range and habitat
Furcifer willsii can be found in central Madagascar, with a type locality of west Imerina Imady, in the forest region. It can also be found in northern and central northeast Madagascar. Records show that this species has been found Tsingy de Bemaraha Strict Nature Reserve. F. willsii may have been sighted once in western Madagascar at Ankarafantsika National Park, although this observation has not been verified as of 2007. Reports from Tsingy de Bemaraha Strict Nature Reserve are uncertain: they may be of F. willsii, F. petteri, or a similar, undescribed species.

Conservation status
The International Union for Conservation of Nature (IUCN) believe that the population of the canopy chameleon is declining. However, it is rated as Least Concern as there is not enough evidence that this species is declining fast enough to become endangered or threatened. Furcifer willsii is threatened by agricultural clearance and logging.

Furcifer willsii is an arboreal species often found high in the canopy mostly in humid forests. It seems to be able to adapt to degraded habitats at the edge of native forests. Large numbers of this species were exported from Madagascar between 1989 and 1993 before the trade from Madagascar was banned by the CITES multilateral treaty.

Description
Furcifer willsii is green and white in colour, sometimes with a hint of brown along the back and head.

Reproduction
F. willsii is oviparous.

Taxonomy
Furcifer willsii was initially described in 1890 by Albert Günther as Chamaeleon willsii. In 1986, it was transferred to the genus Furcifer by Charles Klaver & Wolfgang Böhme. It is commonly known as the canopy chameleon.

References

Further reading
Glaw F, Vences M (2006). A Field Guide to the Amphibians and Reptiles of Madagascar, Third Edition. Cologne, Germany: Vences & Glaw Verlag. 496 pp. .
Günther A (1890). "Tenth contribution to the Knowledge of the Fauna of Madagascar". Annals and Magazine of Natural History, Sixth Series 5: 69-72. ("Chamæleon Willsii ", new species, p. 71 + Plate VI).

Furcifer
chameleon
chameleon
Reptiles described in 1890
Taxa named by Albert Günther